The 2008–09 Iowa State Cyclones men's basketball team represents Iowa State University during the 2008–09 NCAA Division I men's basketball season. The Cyclones were coached by Greg McDermott, who was in his 3rd season. They played their home games at Hilton Coliseum in Ames, Iowa and competed in the Big 12 Conference.

Previous season

The Cyclones finished 14-18, 4-12 in Big 12 play to finish 11th the regular season conference standings.  They lost to Texas A&M in the first round of the Big 12 tournament.

Offseason departures

Recruiting

Roster

Schedule and results

|-
!colspan=12 style=""|Exhibition
|-

|-
!colspan=12 style=""|Regular Season
|-

|-

|-

|-

|-

|-

|-

|-

|-

|-

|-

|-

|-

|-

|-

|-

|-

|-

|-

|-

|-

|-

|-

|-

|-

|-

|-

|-

|-

|-

|-

|-
!colspan=12 style=""|Big 12 Tournament
|-

|-

Awards and honors

All-American

Craig Brackins (2009)

All-Conference Selections

Craig Brackins (1st Team)

Academic All-Big 12 First Team

Sean Haluska (2009)

Ralph A. Olsen Award

Craig Brackins (2009)

References

Iowa State Cyclones men's basketball seasons
Iowa State
Iowa State Cyc
Iowa State Cyc